Paraíba (Tupi: pa'ra a'íba) is a state of Brazil. It is located in the Brazilian Northeast, and it is bordered by Rio Grande do Norte to the north, Ceará to the west, Pernambuco to the south and the Atlantic Ocean to the east. Paraíba is the third most densely populated state of the Northeast; João Pessoa, the sea-bordered state capital, and Campina Grande, in the interior, rank among the fifteen-largest municipalities in the Northeast of Brazil. The state is home to 1.9% of the Brazilian population and produces 0.9% of the Brazilian GDP.

Paraíba is most populated along the Atlantic coast, which extends as far as Ponta do Seixas, the easternmost point of the Americas. The state is a tourist and industrial hotspot; it is known for its cultural heritage, amenable climate and geographical features, ranging from the seaside beaches to the Borborema Plateau. It is named after the Paraíba river.

Some of the most notable Brazilian writers and poets are from Paraíba like Augusto dos Anjos, José Américo de Almeida, José Lins do Rego, Ariano Suassuna and Pedro Américo, the last being also known for his historical paintings.

History

In the mid-16th century, settlers from Spain and Portugal, Olinda and Itamaracá founded Filipéia de Nossa Senhora das Neves (today João Pessoa) at the mouth of the Paraíba do Norte River.

The area soon proved perfect for sugar production, with the French, the Dutch and the Portuguese all constantly fighting to control the Paraíba region to grow the lucrative sugarcane in. The fortress of Santa Catarina, near João Pessoa, was built to protect the city from the Dutch, who soon became a threat to Portuguese supremacy in Brazil.

Geology
In late 1989 a team led by gemstone prospector Heitor Dimas Barbosa uncovered what some consider to be the finest tourmaline crystals ever found in a small mountain range. A trace of copper gives the tourmalines a vivid turquoise color that had never been seen before in the gems, and is sometimes referred to as "neon".

The "neon" Paraíba tourmaline, a vivid blue and blue green, has also been found in other deposits close to the Batalha mine of Barbosa, and also in the neighboring state of Rio Grande do Norte. The bright colors of this tourmaline are due to the presence of copper. Around 2000, a similar copper-containing tourmaline was found in Nigeria, although the colors are not as vivid. Around 2005, crystals of copper-containing tourmaline were found in Mozambique.

Initially, the nomenclature for this tourmaline was "Paraíba tourmaline". Note the capitalization and the accent on the "i". In 2006, the LMHC (Laboratory Manual Harmonization Committee) agreed that "paraiba" should refer to a variety of tourmaline, and not indicate a geographic origin. Note "paraiba" is not capitalized, and does not have an accent on the "i". For more information on paraiba tourmaline, see article on tourmaline. The term "paraiba tourmaline" may now refer to gems found in Brazil, Nigeria, and Mozambique that contain copper and have the characteristic blue-green color.

Demographics

According to the IBGE census , there were 3,766,528 people residing in the state, with a population density of 66.7 inhabitants/km2.
Other numbers include: Urbanization rate: 75.4% (2010), Population growth: 0.8% (1991–2000) and Houses: 987,000 (2006).

The 2010 census also revealed the following figures relating ethnicity: 1,986,619 Brown (Multiracial) people (52.7%), 1,499,253 White (39.8%), 212,968 Black (5.7%) and 67,636 (1.8%) people of Amerindian and Asian ancestry.

Among people of mixed ancestry the White, Amerindian and African altogether combination is the most prevalent one, followed by caboclo, mulato and zambo.

Largest cities

Religion 

According to the 2010 census, the population of Paraíba is made up of Roman Catholics (76.96%), Protestants (15.16%), Spiritists (0.62%), Jehovah's Witnesses (0.47%), Brazilian Apostolic Catholics (0.22 %), Mormons (0.11%), Orthodox Christians (0.05%), Candomblecists (0.035%), Umbanda (0.029%), Esoteric (0.023%), Jewish (0.017%), Eastern religious (0.014%), indigenous traditions ( 0.010%), spiritualists (0.004%), Islamic (0.002%), Hindus (0.002%) and Afro-Brazilian religious (0.001%), in addition to other religiosities. There were also those without religion (5.661%), including atheists (0.106%) and agnostics (0.046%); people with indeterminate religion and/or multiple belonging (0.154%); those who did not know (0.154%) and did not declare (0.016%).

Statistics
Vehicles: 432,337 (March/2007);
Mobile phones: 1.5 million (April/2007)
Fixed line telephones: 431 thousand (April/2007)
Cities: 223 (2007).

Education

Portuguese is the official and only language spoken in the state and thus the primary language taught in schools. Minor dialectal differences regarding other Brazilian varieties are mainly phonological (Northeastern accent).

English and Spanish are part of the official high school curriculum.

Educational institutions
 Universidade Federal da Paraíba (UFPB) (Federal University of Paraíba);
 Universidade Federal de Campina Grande (UFCG) (Federal University of Campina Grande)
 Universidade Estadual da Paraíba (UEPB) (State University of Paraíba);
 UNIPÊ (Centro Universitário de João Pessoa);
 Instituto de Educação Superior da Paraíba (IESP);
 Faculdade Maurício de Nassau (FMN) (Maurício de Nassau College);
 Instituto Federal de Educação Tecnológica (IFPB) (Federal Institute of Technology of Paraiba);
 and many others.

Economy

The service sector is the largest component of GDP at 56.5%, followed by the industrial sector at 33.1%. Agriculture represents 10.4%, of GDP (2004). Paraíba exports: woven of cotton 36.3%, footweares 20.1%, sugar and alcohol 10.8%, fish and crustacean 9.7%, sisal 7%, cotton 6.6% (2002).

Share of the Brazilian economy: 0.8% (2004).

The Paraíba economy is largely based upon the making of shoes and other leather products, the raising of cattle for beef, and sugarcane, corn. Though historically sugarcane has dominated the Paraíba agricultural sector, pineapple, corn, and beans cultivation are also widespread. The other important economical sector in the state is tourism, especially the state urban and unspoilt beaches, ecotourism and festivals such as "carnaval" and "São João."

Infrastructure

International Airport

Located in the municipality of Bayeux,  from downtown João Pessoa, Presidente Castro Pinto International Airport is currently undergoing expansion and remodeling work, which will raise the terminal's annual capacity to 860 thousand passengers.

The surrounding area is sparsely populated, with large open spaces. The existing developments are industrial with some small weekend country houses. There is no rough terrain or tall buildings nearby creating obstacles for takeoffs and landings.
The airport also is blessed with excellent climatic conditions for air operations. Moreover, within its approach radius there are no obstacles that can hinder or create risk for local air traffic. Named for a past president (former name for governors) of Paraíba, Castro Pinto, the airport operates round the clock.

It has all the expected amenities: arrival and departure lounges, a main concourse, check-in counters, baggage storage lockers, airline counters, snack bar/restaurant, tourist information booth, car rental agencies, taxi service and private parking.

Highways

The BR-101 also the BR-230 are found in Paraíba . Several other roads also cross the state composing the complex net which is present all across the country.

National Airport
Located in the interior of the state of Paraíba, in the city of Campina Grande, João Suassuna Airport was remodeled in 2003, receiving a new terminal with capacity of 250 thousand passengers a year.

The old building was demolished and on the site a new facility was built holding nine shops, the main concourse, arrival and departure lounges, VIP lounge, bathrooms, mezzanine and a diaper-changing area.

The boarding area has  and the parking lot has spaces for 180 cars.

This expansion benefited the city both economically and from the standpoint of tourism. With the possibility for new flights, the air cargo movement will be able to grow, along with the number of tourists coming to attend the city's São João Festival.
Three more artworks are on permanent display in the passenger terminal.

Culture

Festa Junina (Saint John Festival)

Festa Junina was introduced to Northeastern Brazil by the Portuguese for whom St John's day (also celebrated as Midsummer Day in several European countries), on the 24th of June, is one of the oldest celebrations of the year. Differently, of course, from what happens on the European Midsummer Day, the festivities in Brazil do not take place during the summer solstice but during the winter solstice. The festivities traditionally begin after the 12th of June, on the eve of St Anthony's day, and last until the 29th, which is Saint Peter's day. During these fifteen days, there are bonfires, fireworks, and folk dancing in the streets (step names are in French, which shows the mutual influences between court life and peasant culture in the 17th, 18th, and 19th-century Europe). Once exclusively a rural festival, today in Brazil, it is largely a city festival during which people joyfully and theatrically mimic peasant stereotypes and clichés in a spirit of jokes and good times. Typical refreshments and dishes are served. Like during Carnival, these festivities involve costume-wearing (in this case, peasant costumes), dancing, heavy drinking, and visual spectacles (fireworks display and folk dancing), such as what happens on Midsummer and St John's Day in Europe, and bonfires are a central part of these festivities in Brazil.

Carnival
The four-day period before Lent leading up to Ash Wednesday is carnival time in Brazil. Rich and poor alike forget their cares as they party in the streets.

Flag
The word nego on the state flag is Portuguese for "I deny" or "I refuse", referring to the events that led to the Brazilian Revolution of 1930.

Due to Milk Coffee Politics in Brazil, the president of the country always alternated between someone from the state of Minas Gerais and someone from the state of São Paulo. In 1929, the incumbent president from São Paulo, Washington Luís, was supposed to support a politician from Minas Gerais as the next president, but he instead decided to nominate someone from São Paulo for the second time in a row, Júlio Prestes. The state governor of Paraíba, João Pessoa Cavalcânti de Albuquerque, refused to support the appointment of Júlio Prestes, and in 1930, Pessoa joined the alliance for the overthrow of the federal government. The revolution succeeded in toppling the Old Republic and installing Getúlio Vargas—who was from neither Minas Gerais nor São Paulo—as the president of Brazil, however, João Pessoa was assassinated; there is still debate as to whether the motive behind his murder was personal, political, or both. Following these events, the word nego was added to the flag of Paraíba.

According to the official government site of the state of Paraíba, the red color stands for the blood of João Pessoa after his assassination, while the black color represents mourning.

Sports

In football, the main teams in the state are: Botafogo from João Pessoa, Campinense and Treze, both from Campina Grande.

Important figures and celebrities

Paraíba is home to some of the most noted Brazilian poets and writers such as Augusto dos Anjos (1884–1908), José Américo de Almeida (1887–1980), José Lins do Rego (1901–1957) and Pedro Américo (1843–1905) (mostly known for his historical paintings).

See also

 Captaincy of Paraíba

Brazil
Ingá Stone (Undeciphered petroglyph in Ingá municipality)

References

External links

 Official Website
 List of cities in Brazil (all cities and municipalities)

 
States of Brazil